IceWeasel can refer to:

Debian Iceweasel, a web browser that is part of Mozilla Corporation software rebranded by the Debian project
GNU IceCat, a web browser formerly known as GNU IceWeasel
Stoat (Mustela erminea), also known as the ermine or short-tailed weasel, which appears white in its winter coat